APEC Japan 2010 was a series of political meetings held around Japan between the 21 member economies of the Asia-Pacific Economic Cooperation during 2010. It culminated in the 18th APEC Economic Leaders' Meeting held in Yokohama from November 13–14, 2010. Japan last hosted an APEC summit in 1995 in Osaka.

A major focus of the meetings were the so-called Bogor Goals, as 2010 was the target year for developed members of the Pacific Rim to achieve free trade and investment.

Theme
Change and action was chosen to represent the need for APEC to build upon its past successes to propose necessary “changes” and execute concrete “actions” during the period of significant change in the global political and economic order to ensure that it will continue to play an important and relevant role in the 21st Century.

See also
 Asia-Pacific Economic Cooperation

References

External links
 
 Mirror website archived by the Ministry of Foreign Affairs of Japan

2010
2010s economic history
Diplomatic conferences in Japan
21st-century diplomatic conferences (Asia-Pacific)
2010 in international relations
2010 conferences
Yokohama
November 2010 events in Japan